The Road Safety Authority (RSA) is a state agency formed by the Irish Government to promote road safety within the Ireland. The agency has devolved control of much of the work of the Department of Transport.

History and Governance
It was established in September 2006, charged with the task of improving safety on Ireland's roads and established under the Road Safety Authority Act 2006, in response to the high number of deaths on Irish roads.

The organisation's headquarters are located at Primrose Hill, Ballina, Co. Mayo. The current chairperson of the RSA is former TD Liz O'Donnell who succeeded veteran TV and radio celebrity, former host of the Late Late Show Gay Byrne. Mr. Byrne secured a second 5-year term in 2011. However, on 16 June 2014, he announced his intention to step down as chairman on 5 August 2014.

Some controversy was caused when Byrne was shown travelling in a car with Terry Wogan when Byrne appeared not to be wearing his seatbelt. Byrne has also admitted to drink driving in the past, "but said it was part of the Irish culture at the time".

The RSA was mentioned in relation to public agencies continuing to operate outside of the remit of the Office of the Ombudsman and Information Commissioner, in a speech delivered by Emily O'Reilly in 2010.

In 2013, the CEO of the RSA, Noel Brett stepped down from his position as chief executive of the State-funded Road Safety Authority (RSA) to take up a position as chief lobbyist for the Irish Banking Federation:

"His appointment will come as a surprise given his lack of experience in the financial services sector, especially when the main banks in Ireland are striving to return to profitability and are under significant pressure to deal with the issue of mortgage arrears."

Functions 
Amongst the functions of the RSA are the promotion of road safety, research on accidents and road safety, driver testing and licensing, as well as establishing vehicle-related and other safe driving standards.

The RSA and the Garda Síochána enforce the licensing provisions of the Road Transport Acts: "As well as a fine, if you are an unlicensed haulier you can expect the RSA to look closely at your compliance with other laws, such as those covering: Drivers’ hours rules, Road traffic requirements, Roadworthiness of your vehicles and trailers."

The RSA is also responsible for monitoring progress of The National Road Safety Strategy (2007–2012) which aims to reduce collisions, deaths and injuries on Irish roads by 30%. Achieving this would bring Ireland in line with countries that are considered to have the safest roads in the world – such as Holland, Sweden and the UK.

Under the banner of NDLS (National Driver Licence Service) the RSA is now responsible for the issuing of driving licences in Ireland.

Initiatives
The RSA's "He drives, she dies" campaign, which aimed to raise awareness among female drivers of the risks of getting into cars with men they feel may not drive safely, came in for some criticism in the Irish media. The country's Broadcasting Complaints Commission also received a number of complaints from members of the public relating to the campaign. RSA Chief Executive Noel Brett defended the campaign as justified by accident statistics, saying that "women need to know that they are being killed through male-dominated driver errors such as speeding and drink driving," adding "male drivers are four times more likely to be involved in a fatal collision than a female driver".

The authority subsequently announced it was considering a number of practical options to further its aim to cut death rates among the country's young male drivers, including the possibility of a late-night driving curfew for all male drivers under the age of 25.

Other recent initiatives include the recommendation of a number of changes to Ireland's National Car Test, which is supervised by the RSA, requiring vehicles older than ten years to be tested every year as opposed to biennially, while stricter controls will be introduced on non-functioning fault warning lights, overly noisy exhausts, and tinted windows and windscreens.

In 2008 the Road Safety Authority received information from vehicle checking agency Cartell about the issue of written off cars from the UK being imported, repaired and registered for use in Ireland. The subsequent Irish Times article provoked an investigation by the Garda Siochána, Vehicle Registration Unit, Road Safety Authority and Revenue Commissioners. This resulted in a change to legislation so that from September 2010 all imported vehicles must be taken to a National Car Test Centre for inspection before being registered in Ireland.

In October 2009, it was announced that the RSA had struck an agreement under which the disqualification of drivers in Ireland and in the UK will be mutually recognised. The accord, which is the first such deal between two EU member states, will come into effect in February 2010.

In 2011 RTÉ revealed that individuals in some of the National Car Testing Service centres could issue an NCT car safety certificate on payment of €100 for cars with serious safety defects. The tests are subcontracted to and conducted by Applus.

In June 2011 Ireland's improvement in reducing road safety fatalities enabled it to be ranked in sixth place for road safety in the EU. The RSA stated: "The number of Irish road deaths fell to 212 in 2010, the lowest level on record, down 26 from 2009. The Government’s road safety target of achieving no more than 252 deaths per annum by the end of 2012 was achieved three years ahead of schedule."

On 5 October 2011, the RSA announced a joint venture with the Irish Tyre Industry Association with the intention of promoting a "tyre safety" week. Two days later the RSA issued a fresh announcement distancing itself from the practical demonstration of vehicle stopping distances it had earlier endorsed after it was alleged that one of the test vehicles used in the tyre safety demonstration had had its ABS braking system disabled.

In 2012, the RSA, having been consulted to offer an opinion on a TV advertisement for Meteor (a mobile telephone service provider), concluded that "they were of the view that the advertisement promoted highly dangerous road user behaviour".

The advertisement included a comedic segment showing a cyclist following a bus to receive free wifi.
Whilst the cyclist depicted in the Meteor ad was wearing a helmet, he was using a mobile phone whilst riding a bicycle.

RSA Reports 
 RSA 2010 Annual report
 RSA's commitments under the Croke Park Agreement
 The Road Safety Authority's Customer Charter updated: http://www.rsa.ie/Documents/About%20Us/Customer_Charter_RSA_WEB.pdf

References

External links
 Road Safety Authority

Road safety
Government agencies of the Republic of Ireland
Road transport in the Republic of Ireland
Road safety in the Republic of Ireland
Department of Transport (Ireland)